The 1999 Asian PGA Tour, titled as the 1999 Davidoff Tour for sponsorship reasons, was the fifth season of the Asian PGA Tour, the main men's professional golf tour in Asia excluding Japan.

Schedule
The following table lists official events during the 1999 season.

Order of Merit
The Order of Merit was based on prize money won during the season, calculated in U.S. dollars.

Notes

References

Asian PGA Tour
Asian Tour